Essential Ballads is a compilation album by Jeff Scott Soto. It consists ballads from Soto's solo albums.
A cover of "Send Her My Love" by Journey was recorded only for this CD.

The cd also contains 3 bonus tracks*

Track listing
"If This Is the End" - 4:41
"As I Do 2 U" - 4:14
"Holding On" - 5:24
"Send Her My Love" - 4:23
"Lonely Shade of Blue" - 5:26
"This Ain't the Love" - 5:17
"Dont' Wanna Say Goodbye" - 4:21
"4U" - 4:13
"Still Be Loving U" - 3:38
"Till the End of Time" - 5:16
"Sacred Eyes" - 3:23
"By Your Side" - 4:25
"Beginning 2 End" - 5:28
"Through It All"* - 3:23
"Last Mistake"* - 4:11
"Another Try"* - 3:12

Personnel
Jeff Scott Soto - Bass, Guitar, Percussion, Arranger, Keyboards, Vocals, Producer, Engineer, Mixing, Drum Loop
Executive Producer: Richard Mace for JSS Promotions Ltd
George Bernhardt Bass, Guitar, Drum Programming
Jamie Borger - Drums, Musician
Jamie Brown - Musician
Göran Elmquist - Guitar, Keyboards, Programming
Joey Fingers - Percussion
Neil Goldberg - Guitar
Alex Llorens - Guitar
Marcus Nand - Guitar
Alex Papa - Drums
Ricky Phillips - Bass, Guitar, Background Vocals
Gary Schutt - Bass Guitar
Howie Simon - Acoustic Guitar, Guitar, Soloist
Glen Sobel Drums, Musician
Jody Whitesides Musician, Guitar (12 String Acoustic)
Peter de Wint Engineer

2006 compilation albums
Jeff Scott Soto albums
Frontiers Records compilation albums